Eastwood Rides Again is a studio album by The Upsetters, released in 1970.

Track listing
All tracks composed by Lee "Scratch" Perry, except where indicated.
"Eastwood Rides Again" – 2:59
"Hit Me" – 2:28
"Knock on Wood" (The Untouchables) – 2:46
"Pop Corn" – 2:10
"Catch This" – 2:18
"You Are Adorable" – 3:28
"Capsol" – 2:26
"Power Pack" – 2:29
"Dollar in the Teeth" – 2:33
"Baby Baby" (Val Bennett) – 2:15
"Django (Ol' Man River)" (Jerome Kern/Oscar Hammerstein II) – 2:31
"Red Hot" – 2:46
"Salt and Pepper" – 2:37
"Tight Spot" – 2:35

References 

The Upsetters albums
1970 albums
Trojan Records albums
Albums produced by Lee "Scratch" Perry